Sir William Romney's School is an 11–16 secondary school with academy status in Tetbury, Gloucestershire, England. Pupils come from the Tetbury, Leighterton, Stroud, Cirencester, Nailsworth and Avening areas. In 2016 the school achieved a 'Good' rating from Ofsted.

History

School 
Sir William Romney (d. 1611), a native of Tetbury, was one of the founders of the East India Company. He set aside some money in his will for a school to help children read and write.

In 1837 a National School was built off the Charlton road. In 1921 a grammar school called Sir Willam Romney's School was opened in Long Street. In 1952 it had become a comprehensive school, and in 1969 it moved to the current site at the end of Lowfield Road. The school was awarded Performing Arts status in 2005.

The school's 400th anniversary was celebrated in 2010.  In 2020 Sir William Romney's School joined The Athelstan Trust, a multi-academy trust consisting of secondary schools in Wiltshire and Gloucestershire.

Headteachers 
 1995–2008: Eric Dawson
 2008–2016: Steven McKay
 2016–2022: Jon Bell

Pipe organ
In 2017 a 19th-century pipe organ, built by William Sweetland of Bath, was relocated to the school from Claremont Methodist Chapel, Bath. The two-manual organ is in the main hall and has 13 speaking stops. The cost of relocating the organ was met by parents and friends of the school. The organ relocation was carried out by head of music, Peter Dillon, assisted by a retired organ builder.

The organ has the following departments and stops:

 Pedal: Bourdon 16'
 Great: Open Diapason 8', Dulciana 8', Clarabella 8', Principal 4', Flute 4', Fifteenth 2'
 Swell (fully enclosed): Open Diapason 8', Lieblich Gedact 8', Salicional 8', Vox Celeste 8', Principal 4', Oboe 8'

Sixth form
Despite a fight to keep the school's sixth form from closing, Sir William Romney's 16 to 18 provision ended in 2007.

References

External links
 

Academies in Gloucestershire
Secondary schools in Gloucestershire
Tetbury